Konstantinos Doumtsios (born 20 September 1997) is a Greek professional footballer who plays as a striker for Super League club Levadiakos.

Personal life 
Doumtsios hails from Ano Poroia, Serres.

Honours
Levadiakos
Super League 2: 2021–22

References

1997 births
Living people
Greek footballers
Football League (Greece) players
Super League Greece 2 players
Super League Greece players
Iraklis Thessaloniki F.C. players
Aiginiakos F.C. players
Panserraikos F.C. players
Doxa Drama F.C. players
Panionios F.C. players
A.E. Karaiskakis F.C. players
Levadiakos F.C. players
Association football forwards
Footballers from Serres